The Santiago–Valparaíso railway is a railway line linking the Chilean capital city Santiago with the port city of Valparaíso.

History
Passenger service ceased on this line in 1987, and freight traffic almost non-existent since then. Proposals have existed since the 1990s to build a more direct line between the two cities for passengers and freight. The section from Valparaíso to Limache was doubled and put underground in Viña del Mar as part of the Valparaíso Metro.

Current proposals

A study commissioned by EFE in 2016 outlined three different potential routes for a new Santiago–Valparaíso line, using the Chilean rail network's existing Indian gauge, and cost between US$4–5 billion.

In 2018, a proposal was submitted by the Tren Valparaíso Santiago consortium of local firm Sigdo Koppers and China Railway Engineering Corporation.

References

External links
 Tren Valparaíso Santiago - Official site

Transport in Chile
Rail transport in Chile
Proposed railway lines
Railway lines opened in 1863